Idli podi, chutney pudi, or milagai podi is a coarse spice powder, originating from the Indian subcontinent, with a  mixture of ground dry spices that typically contains dried chilis, black gram, chickpeas, salt and sesame seeds. The spice mix is commonly referred to in informal speech as "gunpowder" or chutney powder. It is generally mixed with gingelly (sesame) oil or melted ghee when it is served alongside idli or dosa.

See also
 List of condiments
 Recipe for Making Idli At Home

References

Herb and spice mixtures